Antigonus was an ancient Greek army surgeon, mentioned by Galen, who must therefore have lived in or before the second century CE. Marcellus Empiricus quotes a physician of the same name, who may very possibly be the same person; and Lucian mentions an impudent quack named Antigonus, who among other things, said that one of his patients had been restored to life after having been buried for twenty days.

Notes

2nd-century Greek physicians